Héroes Inmortales VII (Spanish for "Immortal Heroes VII") was a professional wrestling event produced by the AAA promotion. The event, which commemorated the seventh anniversary of the death of AAA founder Antonio Peña, took place on October 18, 2013, at Gimnasio Miguel Hidalgo in Puebla, Puebla. While the 2011 and 2012 Peña memorial shows were both simply billed as Héroes Inmortales, the 2013 edition returned to using a Roman numeral, VII for seven, in its name. The event was headlined by El Texano Jr. defending the AAA Mega Championship against Psycho Clown and also featured the annual Copa Antonio Peña. The event also included a memorial ceremony for AAA wrestler and the uncle of Psycho Clown, El Brazo, who died due to complications from diabetes three days before the event.

Production

Background
On October 5, 2006, founder of the Mexican professional wrestling, company AAA Antonio Peña died from a heart attack. The following year, on October 7, 2007, Peña's brother-in-law Jorge Roldan who had succeeded Peña as head of AAA held a show in honor of Peña's memory, the first ever Antonio Peña Memorial Show (Homenaje a Antonio Peña in Spanish). AAA made the tribute to Peña into a major annual event that would normally take place in October of each year, renaming the show series Héroes Inmortales (Spanish for "Immortal Heroes"), retroactively rebranding the 2007 and 2008 event as Héroes Inmortales I and Héroes Inmortales II. As part of their annual tradition AAA holds a Copa Antonio Peña ("Antonio Peña Cup") tournament with various wrestlers from AAA or other promotions competing for the trophy. The tournament is normally either a gauntlet match or a multi-man torneo cibernetico elimination match. Outside of the actual Copa Antonio Peña trophy the winner is not guaranteed any other "prizes" as a result of winning, although several Copa Antonio Peña winners did go on to challenge for the AAA Mega Championship. The 2013 show was the seventh show in the Héroes Inmortales series of shows.

Storylines
The Héroes Inmortales show featured eight professional wrestling matches with different wrestlers involved in pre-existing, scripted feuds, plots, and storylines. Wrestlers were portrayed as either heels (referred to as rudos in Mexico, those that portray the "bad guys") or faces (técnicos in Mexico, the "good guy" characters) as they followed a series of tension-building events, which culminated in a wrestling match or series of matches.

Results

References

2013 in professional wrestling
2013
2013 in Mexico
October 2013 events in Mexico